The First Secretary of the Central Committee of the Communist Party of Estonia was the leader of the Communist Party of Estonia, which was in turn a branch of the Communist Party of the Soviet Union.

Below is a list of office-holders:

Footnotes

Sources 
World Statesmen – Estonian Soviet Socialist Republic

Politics of Estonia
Estonian SSR
Lists of political office-holders in Estonia
List
List